The men's 60 metres hurdles event  at the 2002 European Athletics Indoor Championships was held on March 1–2.

Medalists

Note: Evgeny Pechonkin of Russia had originally won the bronze but was later disqualified for doping.

Results

Heats
First 2 of each heat (Q) and the next 6 fastest (q) qualified for the semifinals.

Semifinals
First 4 of each semifinals qualified directly (Q) for the final.

Final

References
Results

60 metres hurdles at the European Athletics Indoor Championships
60